The information regarding List of rivers in the Valparaíso Region on this page has been compiled from the data supplied by GeoNames. It includes all features named "Rio", "Canal", "Arroyo", "Estero" and those Feature Code is associated with a stream of water. This list contains 174 water streams.

Content
This list contains:
 Name of the stream, in Spanish Language
 Coordinates are latitude and longitude of the feature in ± decimal degrees, at the mouth of the stream
 Link to a map including the Geonameid (a number which uniquely identifies a Geoname feature)
 Feature Code explained in 
 Other names for the same feature, if any
 Basin countries additional to Chile, if any

List

 Estero de Pedernales3876920STM
 Canal de Las Vegas3883791DTCH
 Estero Yali3867760STM(Estero Yali, Estero de Yali)
 Rio MaipoRío Maipo3880983STM (see tributaries in List of rivers of the Santiago Metropolitan Region)
 Rio RapelRío Rapel3873714STM
 Estero de Los Corralillos3882128STM(Estero Corralillos, Estero Corrolillos, Estero de Los Corralillos)(CL)

  Río Tilama3869850STM
  Estero RaicesEstero Raíces3873848STM
  Cajon InfiernilloCajón Infiernillo3887214STM(Cajon Infiernillo, Cajón Infiernillo, Estero Maquis)
  Rio PedernalRío Pedernal3876928STM(Estero de Chaloco, Rio Pedernal, Río Pedernal)
  Rio del SobranteRío del Sobrante3870778STM(Rio Sobrante, Rio del Sobrante, Río Sobrante, Río del Sobrante)
  Rio SobranteRío Sobrante3870779STM
  Estero Los Molles3881731STM(Estero Los Molles, Estero Molles)
  Estero de la Ballena3898908STM
  Estero Manzano3880614STM
  Estero el Ajial3900318STM
  Estero Chincolco3895016STM(Estero Chincolco, Quebrada de Chincolco)
  Quebrada Los Riocitos3881409STM
  Estero Denquer3892648STM
  Estero Las Palmas3884085STM
  Estero GuaquenEstero Guaquén3888376STM(Estero Guaquen, Estero Guaquén, Estero de Huaquen)
  Estero de la Canoa3896900STMI
  Río Alicahue3900094STM(Estero Alicahue)
  Rio TambillosRío Tambillos3870194STM
  Canal Seco3871065DTCH
  Rio PetorcaRío Petorca3876414STM(Rio Pelorca, Rio Petorca, Río Petorca)
  Rio La LiguaRío La Ligua3885452STM(Rio La Ligua, Rio de la Ligua, Río La Ligua, Río de la Ligua)
  Río Los Angeles3882423STM(Estero Cajon de Los Angeles, Estero Cajón de Los Ángeles, Estero Los Angeles, Estero de los Angeles, Estero de los Ángeles)
  Río de los AngelesRío de los Ángeles3899640STM(Estero de Los Anjeles, Estero de los Angeles, Estero de los Ángeles)(CL)
  Canal de Longotoma3882545DTCH
  Estero de Chacai3895790STMI
  Canal Valle Hermoso3868638DTCH
  Estero El Espinal3891382STM(Estero El Espinal, Estero Espinal)(CL)
  Estero El Pangue3890833STM(Estero El Pangue, Estero Pangue)
  Estero La Patagua3885085STM(Estero La Patagua, Estero Patagua)
  Estero de los Azules3899021STM
  Río Portillo Hondo3875374STM
  Estero La Patagua3885084STM(Estero La Patagua, Estero de la Patagua)
  Río Chalaco3895629STM(Estero Chalaco, Estero del Chaco)
  Rio del RocinRío del Rocín3872985STM
  Estero del Bolsillo3898110STM
  Rio HidalgoRío Hidalgo3888055STM
  Río Las Piedras3884021STM
  Río Cajon de Los AngelesRío Cajón de Los Ángeles3897387STM(Estero Cajon de Los Angeles, Estero Cajon de los Anjeles, Estero Cajón de Los Ángeles, Estero Cajón de los Anjeles, Quebrada Los Anjeles)(CL)
  Estero GuayacanEstero Guayacán3888314STM(Estero Guayacan, Estero Guayacán, Esterro de Guayacan, Esterro de Guayacán)
  Rio BlancoRío Blanco3898216STM(Estero Blanco, Estero Leiva, Rio Blanco, Río Blanco)
  Estero del Zorro3867474STM
  Estero Columpios del Diablo3893987STM
  Río Leiva3883429STM
  Estero La Retamilla3884787STM
  Estero El Blanquillo3891885STM(Estero Blanquillos, Estero El Blanquillo)
  Estero de Coligue3894261STM
  Río Tierras Blancas3869869STM
  Estero El Tordillo3890277STM
  Estero Las Minillas3884155STM(Estero Las Minillas, Quebrada Las Minillas)
  Quebrada de La Canela3886359STM(Estero La Canela, Quebrada de La Canela)
  Estero Catapilco3896172STM
  Estero de Las Lagunillas3884268STM
  Río Casas Viejas3896333STMI
  Estero El Gallo3891332STM
  Estero El Sauce3890379STM
  Estero del Tocadillo3869733STM
  Río GomezRío Gómez3888932STM(Cajon de Gomez, Cajón de Gómez, Estero de Gomez, Estero de Gómez)
  Estero de Las Cabritas3884569STM(Estero Cabritas, Estero de Las Cabritas)(CL)
  Estero La Laviera3885490STM
  Estero El Cobre3891588STM(Estero El Cobre, Estero del Cobre)
  Estero El CarretonEstero El Carretón3891697STM(Estero El Carretero, Estero El Carreton, Estero El Carretón, Estero del Carreton, Estero del Carretón)
  Estero San Regis3871725STM
  Canal San Miguel3871900DTCH
  Estero Jahuel3887000STM
  Rio de Los LeonesRío de Los Leones3881952STM(Rio Leones, Rio de Los Leones, Rio de los Leones, Río Leones, Río de Los Leones, Río de los Leones)
  Estero de la CanadaEstero de la Cañada3897044STM
  Río Seco3871061STM
  Estero QuilpueEstero Quilpué3874094STM
  Estero del SainoEstero del Saíno3872639STM
  Estero El Cobre3891587STM(Estero El Cobre, Estero del Cobre, Quebrada El Cobre)
  Río San Francisco3872218STM(Estero San Francisco, Quebrada San Francisco)
  Estero Campiche3950060STM(Estero Campiche, Estero Compiche)
  Canal Nogales3878573DTCH
  Canal El Monte3890946DTCH
  Estero de La Gloria3885863STM(Estero de La Gloria, Estero de la Gloria)
  Estero de Los Riecillos3881413STM
  Río  MelonEstero Melón3880085STM
  Canal Calvino3897201DTCH
  Estero PucalanEstero Pucalán3875110STM
  Canal Huidobro3887561DTCH(Canal Guidobro, Canal Huidobro)
  Canal de PurutunCanal de Purutún3874573DTCH
  Canal Mazzino3880259DTCH
  Estero ChilicauquenEstero Chilicauquén3895102STM
  Estero Pocuro3875556STM
  Canal de Mena3880063DTCH
  Canal Hurtadino3887428DTCH
  Canal El MelonCanal El Melón3891045DTCH(Canal El Melon, Canal El Melón, Canal el Melon, Canal el Melón, Estero del Melon)
  Estero Los Mayos3881768STMI(Estero Los Magos, Estero Los Mayos)(CL)
  Canal El Salero3890453DTCH
  Canal Coquimbito3893632DTCH
  Estero La Gloria3885864STM(Estero La Gloria, Estero de la Gloria)
  Rio Casa de PiedraRío Casa de Piedra3896383STM
  Estero de Rabuco3873878STM
  Canal Lorino3882481DTCH
  Estero de Rapaculo3873722STM
  Estero Los Chinos3882211STMA
  Canal Comunero3893938DTCH
  Estero del MaitenEstero del Maitén3880966STM
  Estero Ojo de Agua3878143STM
  Rio JuncalilloRío Juncalillo3886714STM
  Estero de la Cuesta3893136STMI
  Canal Pachacama3877842DTCH
  Estero del PenonEstero del Peñón3876622STM
  Estero Quintero3873981STM(Estero Quintero, Estero de Quintero)
  Canal ValdesCanal Valdés3868724DTCH
  Río Potrero Escondido3875278STM
  Estero Mardones3880528STM
  Rio AconcaguaRío Aconcagua3900683STM(Rio Aconcagua, Río Aconcagua)
  Estero Limache3883213STM(Estero Limache, Estero de Limache)
  Estero de Los Litres3881929STM
  Estero Los Loros3881887STM(Estero Los Loros)
  Estero Catemu3896160STM(Estero Catemu)
  Estero QuilpueEstero Quilpué3874093STM
  Rio PutaendoRío Putaendo3874568STM
  Estero Pocuro3875557STM(Estero Pocuro)
  Rio ColoradoRío Colorado3894032STM
  Rio JuncalRío Juncal3886721STM
  Rio BlancoRío Blanco3898215STM
  Estero de Navarro3878986STM(Cajon de Navarro, Estero de Navarro, Quebrada de Navarro, Rio Navarro, Río Navarro)
  Estero de las Hualtatas3887780STM(Estero de las Gualtatas, Estero de las Hualtatas)
  Estero Riecillos3873318STM
  Estero de la Polvareda3875480STM(Estero de Las Polvaredas, Estero de la Polvareda)
  Estero San Pedro3871810STM
  Estero de Las Polvaredas3883989STM
  Estero San Isidro3872165STM
  Estero Namica3879065STM
  Rio de los LeonesRío de los Leones3883331STM(Rio de Los Leones, Rio de los Leones, Río de Los Leones, Río de los Leones)
  Estero Monos de Agua3879496STM
  Estero RenacaEstero Reñaca3965376STM
  Estero de Manantiales3880756STM
  Estero PelumpenEstero Pelumpén3876738STM
  Estero Lliu-Lliu3882871STM
  Canal Waddington3867952DTCH
  Canal Waddington3867953DTCH
  Estero Marga Marga3880522STM
  Estero Potrero Escondido3875277STM
  Estero Gallardo3889187STM
  Estero de Las Palmas3884079STM(Estero de Las Palmas, Estero de las Palmas)
  Estero Flores3889434STM
  Estero de Moscoso3879269STM
  Estero del Carrizo3896450STM
  Estero de Los Colihues3882168STMI
  Estero del Fullero3889241STM
  Estero de Moteros3879245STM
  Estero Casablanca3896409STM(Estero Casablanca, Estero de Casablanca)
  Estero de Lo Ovalle3882516STM(Estero Lo Oralle, Estero de Lo Ovalle)
  Estero La Playa3884966STM(Estero La Playa, Rio La Playa, Río La Playa)(CL)
  Estero El Membrillo3891034STM(Estero El Membrillo, Estero del Membrillo, Rio del Membrillo, Río del Membrillo)
  Estero San JeronimoEstero San Jerónimo3872145STM
  Estero de Lo Orrego3882524STM(Arroyo de Orrego, Estero de Lo Orrego, Estero de Lo Orrego Abajo)
  Estero Huallilemu3887782STM(Estero Guallelemu, Estero Huallilemu, Estero de Guallilemo)(CL)
  Estero del Totoral3869435STM
  Estero Carvajal3896419STM(Estero Carrajal, Estero Carvajal, Estero de Carvajal)
  Estero del Rosario3872814STM(Estero El Rosario, Estero del Rosario)
  Estero de las Lagunillas3885721STM
  Estero de la CiguenaEstero de la Cigüeña3894638STM
  Estero de Lo Abarca3882819STM
  Estero de Cartagena3896428STM
  Estero de la VinaEstero de la Viña3868123STM(Estero de La Vina, Estero de La Viña, Estero de la Vina, Estero de la Viña)
  Estero de Las Palmas3884078STM
  Estero Llolleo3965500STM
  Estero de El Sauce3890378STM
  Estero de Leyda3883292STM
  Estero de San Juan3872021STM
  Estero de NancoEstero de Ñanco3879052STM
  Estero Maitenlahue3880919STM

See also
 List of lakes in Chile
 List of volcanoes in Chile
 List of islands of Chile
 List of fjords, channels, sounds and straits of Chile
 List of lighthouses in Chile

Notes

References

External links
 Rivers of Chile
 Base de Datos Hidrográfica de Chile
 

Valparaiso